Giovanni Mazza (born May 22, 2005) is an entertainer who was discovered in the Chicago Bulls Youth Talent Search when he performed a solo violin medley in 2015 at age 9. He began playing the violin at age 3 and began acting at age 7.  He has appeared as an actor on Bella and the Bulldogs and has performed solo violin at a wide range of venues including NBA All-Star Games, Major League Baseball games, 35 National Basketball Association (NBA) games at venues such as Staples Center, United Center, and Madison Square Garden and numerous other events. At age 10, he performed at halftime of the Rising Stars Challenge at the 2016 NBA All-Star Game.

Notes

2005 births
American actors
American violinists
Living people